

Welsh Football League Division One 

This league known as the Nathanielcars.co.uk Welsh League Division One for sponsorship reasons, is a football league in Wales. This is the top division of football in South Wales and the second tier of the Welsh Football League.

The reigning champions are West End.  However, they were not promoted to Welsh Premier League as they did not meet the necessary ground criteria.  

Pen-y-Bont was formed in 2013 following the merger of Bridgend Town F.C. and Bryntirion Athletic F.C.

Promotion and relegation 

Teams promoted from 2012–13 Welsh Football League Division Two
 Goytre - Champions
 Aberbargoed Buds - 2nd Position
 Caerau (Ely) - 3rd Position

Teams relegated from 2012–13 Welsh Premier League
 None

Stadia and Locations

League table

Notes

References 
 http://www.welshpremier.co.uk/ThePyramid.ink 
 http://www.welshleague.org.uk/index.htm
 http://www.welshleague.org.uk/results.htm

Welsh Football League Division One seasons
2
Wales